Ipsos is a market research company.

Ipsos may also refer to:
Ipsos (Phrygia), a town of ancient Phrygia, now in Turkey
Battle of Ipsos, a battle fought near that town in 301 BCE
Ipso (candy), a candy
IPSOS, a magical formula